The Office of the High Commissioner for Peace is a political office in the Executive Branch of Colombia

List of High Commissioners

References

Executive branch of Colombia